Svrčinovec (until 1899 ) is a village and municipality in Čadca District in the Žilina Region of northern Slovakia.

History 
In historical records the village was first mentioned in 1658.

In November 1938, the village was annexed by the Polish Army, in wake of the annexation of Zaolzie region to the Second Polish Republic.

Geography 
The municipality lies at an altitude of 432 metres and covers an area of 15.736 km².

Demographics 
According to the 2001 census, the village had 3 382 inhabitants. 98,29% of inhabitants were Slovaks and 0,98% Czech. The religious make-up was 97,37% Roman Catholics and 0,98% people with no religious affiliation.

References 

Villages and municipalities in Čadca District